Delisha Thomas is a Trinidadian singer-songwriter, best known for her work with producer Rodney "Darkchild" Jerkins. She has written for Beyoncé, Janet Jackson, and Justin Bieber, among others. Thomas is a member of the Canadian Academy of Vocal Music Hall of Fame.

Songwriting and production credits

Credits are courtesy of Discogs, Tidal, Apple Music, and AllMusic.

Awards and nominations

References 

Living people

Year of birth missing (living people)
Trinidad and Tobago emigrants to Canada
21st-century Trinidad and Tobago women singers
21st-century Trinidad and Tobago singers
Trinidad and Tobago singer-songwriters